The Eagle Pass Port of Entry was established around 1896.  The first carriage bridge connecting Eagle Pass, Texas with Piedras Negras, Mexico (then known as Porfirio Díaz) was built in April 1890, but was destroyed in a flood in September 1890.  The bridge was soon replaced by the Eagle Pass–Piedras Negras International Bridge, and was again rebuilt in 1927 and 1954. The road continues into Eagle Pass as U.S. Route 57, and Piedras Negras as Mexican Federal Highway 57.

The original port facility was rebuilt in 1927 and was replaced by the current facility in 1960.  Since the construction of the Eagle Pass Camino Real Port of Entry in 1999, all commercial vehicles are inspected there.

References

See also

 List of Mexico–United States border crossings
 List of Canada–United States border crossings
 Eagle Pass Camino Real Port of Entry

Mexico–United States border crossings
1896 establishments in Texas
Buildings and structures in Maverick County, Texas